The Varenne is a  long river in western France located in the departments of Orne (Normandy) and Mayenne (Pays de la Loire). It is a tributary of the river Mayenne on the right side, and so is a sub-tributary of the Loire by Mayenne and Maine. It flows into the Mayenne near Ambrières-les-Vallées. Its longest tributaries are the Égrenne, the Pisse, the Halouze and the Andainette. The largest town on the Varenne is Domfront en Poiraie.

References

Rivers of France
Rivers of Mayenne
Rivers of Orne
Rivers of Normandy
Rivers of Pays de la Loire